Big Boy (born Kurt Alexander; September 8, 1969) is a nationally syndicated American radio host and actor. From 1997 he has hosted the morning show at Los Angeles Rhythmic contemporary station KPWR (Power 106) until his move in February 2015 to KRRL (Real 92.3).  His stage name derives from his formerly large build, which he modified through duodenal switch surgery in 2003, leading to a nearly fatal weight loss of over 250 pounds.

Life and career
Big Boy was born in Chicago's West Side and moved to Los Angeles at the age of two. After becoming acquainted with the music industry while DJing Culver City High School parties, Big Boy soon became a bodyguard for the music group The Pharcyde. Big Boy was friends with the Baka Boyz, the morning show hosts at Power 106. Always being a funny personality, Big Boy was offered a hosting position with the station, soon proving successful in nighttime and afternoon hosting spots.

Big Boy's image became well known throughout the Greater Los Angeles Area in the late 1990s. However his first big break onto the national spotlight was when he was hired as the announcer on the Vibe TV talk show (named after the popular magazine) in 1998 hosted by comedian Sinbad. When the program ended, apparently Big Boy had media fans at the executive level because Big Boy, in the early 2000s, was offered a host position with Power 106 and was promoted by placing his 500-plus pound image onto billboards throughout the area.

Big Boy has been named Personality of the Year four times by the Radio Music Awards and three times by Radio and Records magazine. The National Association of Broadcasters awarded him the Marconi Award in 2002 and 2004. In September 2015 he was voted as an inductee to the 2015 National Radio Hall of Fame.

He has made cameo appearances in movies such as Malibu's Most Wanted, Soul Plane, The Longest Yard, The Players Club, and Charlie's Angels 2, and co-starred in Deuce Bigalow: Male Gigolo. Fox television signed Big Boy to co-star in the police drama Fastlane in the fall of 2002. Also, Big Boy voiced himself in the 2005 Disney Channel Original Movie, The Proud Family Movie as a host of Wizard Kelly Radio. He has appeared numerous times on the hit HBO  Entourage TV series. He was also featured on the second episode of the VH1 reality series, I Love New York, hosting the "I Love New York Management". Big Boy is in the development process for his own network sitcom and hosts his syndicated weekend show formerly called "Big Boy's Hip Hop Spot." He has performed on-air voice-overs on MTV's reality game show Yo Momma.

Big Boy voiced the character Big Bear in the 2004 video game Grand Theft Auto: San Andreas Big Boy is also an announcer along with Set Free in the 2002 video game Street Hoops. He is a radio host in the 2013 video game Grand Theft Auto V on the Radio Los Santos radio station.

On July 27, 2010, sidekick Tattoo left the show.

In 2010, Big Boy and Power 106 were featured in the movie 'Project X.' During the end of the movie he talked about the party and made reference to Kanye West. On August 6, 2007, Big Boy signed a multi-year deal with ABC Radio Networks to syndicate the show, and his weekend show Big Boy's Hip Hop Spot. The show launched nationally on August 20 and is also now called The Big Boy's Neighborhood Morning Show. 

On November 24, 2010, Big Boy made a special guest performance in Vicente Fernández's concert at the Gibson Amphitheatre performing "Aca Entre Nos".

In September 2010, Big Boy entered into film production via his production company, Ida's Son Productions. The first film, Exit Strategy, is a romantic comedy centering on James (Jameeel Saleem) who is evicted from his apartment and forced to move in with his girlfriend of three months, Kim (Kimelia Weathers) and quickly discovers she's not his type. When he enlists his friend Carville (Quincy 'QDeezy' Harris) and Leona (Noelle Balfour) to help him find an exit out of the relationship. Comedian Kevin Hart makes a cameo role.

On August 22, 2011, Luscious Liz Hernandez left Big Boy's Radio and became a reporter for E! News.

On February 3, 2015, Emmis Communications filed a breach-of-contract suit against Big Boy after he accepted a $3.5 million contract with iHeartMedia and quit the KPWR morning show. iHeart owns crosstown Urban Contemporary station Real 92.3 KRRL. At KPWR, nighttime host J. Cruz was the morning show host until he left the station in 2019 prior to his move to KRRL as its afternoon host with Nick Cannon taking his place as the new host in early June.

In March 2016, a year after he joined KRRL and iHeartMedia, his nationally syndicated program was transferred to iHeart's syndication division Premiere Networks from Westwood One. Beginning July 30, 2018, the show is also carried in a two-hour edited video form on the American cable network FM (Fuse Music).

References

External links

 

1969 births
Television personalities from California
Living people
Radio personalities from Chicago
People from Los Angeles County, California